KPLL-LP (94.9 FM) is a radio station licensed to Lewiston, Idaho, United States. The station is an affiliate of the Positive Life Radio network. The station is currently owned by Lewiston Christian Radio Association.

References

External links
 

PLL-LP
PLL-LP